Zwischenfall in Benderath is an East German film. It was released in 1956.

External links
 

1956 films
East German films
1950s German-language films
1950s German films
German drama films
1956 drama films
German black-and-white films